Siu Chi is one of the 31 constituencies in the Tuen Mun District.

Created for the 1994 District Board elections, the constituency returns one district councillor to the Tuen Mun District Council, with an election every four years.

Siu Chi loosely covers areas surrounding Siu On Court and Chi Lok Fai Yuen in Tuen Mun with an estimated population of 19,954.

Councillors represented

Election results

2010s

2000s

1990s

References

Tuen Mun
Constituencies of Hong Kong
Constituencies of Tuen Mun District Council
1994 establishments in Hong Kong
Constituencies established in 1994